Gustavsvik (or Norra Visby) is a locality situated in Gotland Municipality, Gotland County, on the island of Gotland, Sweden with 453 inhabitants in 2010.

References 

Populated places in Gotland County